Effingham may refer to:

Geography
Europe
Effingham, Surrey, England
Effingham Hundred, a hundred in Surrey that includes the village of Effingham
Effingham Junction railway station, a station near the village

North America
Effingham, Ontario, Canada
Effingham, Illinois, US
Effingham, Kansas, US
Effingham, New Hampshire, US
Effingham, South Carolina, US
Effingham (Aden, Virginia), US, a historic home and national historic district
Effingham County, Georgia, US
Effingham County, Illinois, US

Ships
HMS Effingham (D98), a Hawkins class heavy cruiser

See also
Earl of Effingham
"Effington", a song by Ben Folds from his 2008 album Way to Normal mistakenly named for the Illinois town
Manci Howard, Lady Howard of Effingham